Chen Nien-chin (born 10 May 1997) is a Taiwanese middleweight boxer. In 2016, she won a bronze medal at the world championships, but was eliminated in the first bout at the Rio Olympics. She is a native of Hualien County. Chen is of Taiwanese aborigines descent, with one parent being Amis and the other being Bunun.

Boxing career
Chen represented her nation at the 2020 Tokyo Olympics in Welterweight category and reached the quarterfinals. On 30 July 2021, she lost to Lovlina Borgohain of India and failed to ensure a medal. She earned a gold medal at the 2022 Thailand Open International Boxing Tournament.

References

External links

 

1997 births
Living people
Taiwanese women boxers
Olympic boxers of Taiwan
Boxers at the 2016 Summer Olympics
Boxers at the 2020 Summer Olympics
AIBA Women's World Boxing Championships medalists
People from Hualien County
Amis people
Bunun people
Boxers at the 2014 Summer Youth Olympics
Middleweight boxers
21st-century Taiwanese women